The Brisbane Roar End of Season Awards are the individual awards won by players of the Australian football club, Brisbane Roar, who compete in each of the A-League, National Youth League and W-League competitions. These awards are presented annually at the club's presentation night following the completion of the A-League season.

Brisbane Roar Senior Team

Gary Wilkins Medal (Player of the Year)

Player's Player Award

Member's Player of the Year

Golden Boot

Queensland Roars Against Racism Multicultural Ambassador Award 

Discontinued after the 2010–11 season.

Young Player of the Year

National Youth League

Player of the Year

Westfield Women's League

Player of the Year

Player's Player of the Year

Golden Boot

Young Player of the Year

References

External links 
 Brisbane Roar.com
 A-League.com

End of Year Awards